Gaultier or Gaultiere is a barony in County Waterford, Republic of Ireland.

Etymology
Gaultier barony is derived from the Irish for "land of the foreigners" — specifically, the Vikings, who settled here when they were expelled from Waterford City by the Cambro-Norman and English invaders in the later 12th century.

Geography
Gaultier is located in eastern County Waterford, between Tramore Bay and Waterford Harbour. It contained the parish of Kilculliheen until 1872, when that area was transferred to County Kilkenny.

History

Gaultier, as stated above, was a settlement of Vikings expelled from Waterford city. They established a "Cantred of the Danes" or "Ostmanstowns of Waterford" in 1384.

After the Cromwellian conquest of Ireland, Gaultier was granted to the Lymbery family, and they were for generations landlords and Church of Ireland clergymen in the region. Other important families were Anthony, Brunnock, Comerford, Everard, Grant, Jackson, Mandeville, Sherlock, Wadding and Wyse.

The barony was established by 1672.

It gives its name to Gaultier GAA, a Gaelic football club established in 1927 and based in Dunmore East.

List of settlements

Below is a list of settlements in Gaultier barony:

Cheekpoint
Dunmore East
Faithlegg
Passage East

References

External links
Gaultier Historical Society

Baronies of County Waterford